Cui Yongyuan (born February 20, 1963) is a Chinese television personality, producer, and social media commentator. He is known for leaking information regarding the Chinese film industry's yin-yang contracts leading to Fan Bingbing's removal from the spotlight, his affable and natural sense of humour, pioneering a brand of relaxed and unscripted presentation style that marked a departure from the rigid and staid nature of many Chinese talk shows.

Cui rose to fame hosting the show Tell It Like It Is on China Central Television from 1996 to 2002. After a battle with depression, Cui returned to CCTV to host Talk with Xiaocui. From 2012 to 2013 Cui hosted the show Thank the Heavens and the Earth that you are here. He left CCTV in 2013 to work at his alma mater, the Communication University of China.

Biography
Cui was born on February 20, 1963, in the Beichen District of Tianjin. His father was in the military. The family moved to Beijing when Cui was three years old, and he attended primary and high school in Beijing. Cui graduated from the Communication University of China in 1985, then began working for China Central Television as a reporter shortly thereafter. Starting in 1993, Cui became involved in the planning for the Oriental Horizon (东方时空) program.

The show Tell It Like It Is (实话实说) began in 1996, and was conceptualized as a Sunday supplement to Oriental Horizon, with Cui as host. The first show aired on April 26, 1996. Soon after Tell it like it is gained a following in its own right, in large part due to Cui's personality. Cui's brand of television spurred a host of copycat shows in other networks attempting to emulate Cui's natural and humorous presentation style in a Chinese TV world that is full of staid and scripted presentation.

With the success of Tell it like it is, Cui became a national celebrity. He was invited to host the 2000 edition of the CCTV New Year's Gala. Beginning in 2001 Cui was diagnosed with clinical depression. He reported severe trouble falling asleep. He left Tell it like it is abruptly in 2002.

After a battle with depression, Cui returned to CCTV to host Talk with Xiao Cui (小崔说事). Cui was named as one of the Top Ten Best Hosts of CCTV for 2005. In addition, during the 2007 National People's Congress he hosted a talk show where he met with regional Chinese leaders to discuss everyday issues of concern to the people, the first of its kind in the PRC.

Cui has made several appearances at the CCTV New Year's Gala. He appeared twice in skits featuring Zhao Benshan and Song Dandan entitled Yesterday, Today, and Tomorrow in 1999 and again in 2006. He also danced and sang with Taiwan actress and My Fair Princess star Ruby Lin in 2000.

In November 2013, Cui Yongyuan embarked upon a two-week journey to the United States to film a documentary on genetically modified foods. In the documentary Cui aimed to explore the debate on whether genetically modified food is safe to eat. The documentary was widely viewed in China and was criticized by anti-pseudoscience crusader Fang Zhouzi as being unscientific and misleading. Cui and Fang then exchanged a series of increasingly personal comments on a public micro-blogging platform, attacking each other. After the heated and widely publicized exchange, Fang sued Cui in a Beijing court demanding compensation of 670,000 yuan, alleging defamation. Chinese-language media has cited fallout from the conflict as a reason Cui has decided to leave television for a position to teach at the Communications University of China, his alma mater.

In January 2015, Cui signed on with Shanghai-based Dragon Television to host the program "Eyes on Dongfang" (东方眼). At the 2015 National People's Congress, Cui bantered with Central Commission for Discipline Inspection chief Wang Qishan, remarking "I don't think I did anything wrong, but I'm still pretty nervous when I see you," ostensibly a reference to Wang's work in the anti-corruption campaign. Cui also shot a mobile phone video with Wang.

In June 2018, he leaked two contradicting film contracts for Fan Bingbing's Feng Xiaogang film Cell Phone 2, accusing her of using what are considered yin-yang contracts to conduct tax evasion. Cui later apologized after allegations surfaced indicating Fan may have been removed from the spotlight by the Chinese government.

Controversies

Anti-GMO campaign
In September 2013, Cui Yongyuan and Fang Zhouzi had an online debate on the commercialization of GMO foods. After that, Cui went to Japan and the US and conducted a private investigation on the consumption and regulations of GMO in those two countries. In 2014, Cui claimed that Fang operated an illegal trust fund and bought a luxurious house in California worth $670,000 USD with money earned through deceitful and shady practices. Fang therefore sued him for slandering. The verdict was released on June 25, 2015, deciding that both parties are at fault and each should release apologies publicly to the other. Fang decided to appeal.

On March 26, 2015, Cui gave a talk at Fudan University on the topic of GMO. The organizers tried to discourage students and faculty members from the Life Science Department from attending by not sending a public invitation, but Professor Lu Daru of the Genetics Institute got the news and challenged him on site during the Q and A session. Cui claimed that Lu "have not the knowledge of broadcasting, and therefore does not qualify to debate him on the same level," and also declared that "us 'consensus front of journalists' thinks that your ('consensus front of scientific researchers', a phrase used by Lu earlier) claims (on GMO) is not well founded."

In July 2015, a Weibo microblogger (a platform similar to Twitter in China) posted a parody fake-news stating that “French fries from both KFC and McDonald's are found to contain a potentially poisonous chemical called sodium chloride”. Not knowing that sodium chloride is common salt, Cui fell for it and reblogged this as news and even featured this repost on his Weibo account with a sarcastic comment “This is not scientific, because medical research has not found even one case of people getting sick due to eating French fries from KFC or McDonald's. This is exactly the same as GMO!” He was soon ridiculed for his lack of common knowledge of chemistry due to this, and many questioned his basic skills in natural sciences.

Reporting of data security issues of China Record Corporation's business practice
On June 8, 2015, Cui posted on his Weibo that China Record Corporation has subcontracted the digitization of some historical documents to a Japanese company, which including the release of master copies to the contractor. Cui claims that such act is in violation of regulations on data security and needs to be reported. China Record Corporation replied by saying that the digitization work is done by a subsidiary company named Victory Records and Videos and all that are involved in the process are strictly Chinese citizens.

Programs hosted
 Tell it like it is
 Talk with Xiao Cui
 Legend of Movies
 Thank Earth and the Heavens That You Came
 Oriental Eye (a.k.a. Eyes on the East, or Eyes on Dong Fang)

References 

CCTV television presenters
Living people
1963 births
Communication University of China alumni
People from Tianjin
Academic staff of the Communication University of China
Members of the 12th Chinese People's Political Consultative Conference
Members of the 11th Chinese People's Political Consultative Conference